Solomon Embra Brannan (born September 5, 1942) is a former American football defensive back who played three seasons in the American Football League (AFL) with the Kansas City Chiefs and New York Jets. He played college football at Morris Brown College and attended Tompkins High School in Savannah, Georgia. Brannan has also been a member of the Jacksonville Sharks of the World Football League. He was a member of the Kansas City Chiefs team that won the 1966 AFL championship.

References

External links
Just Sports Stats

Living people
1942 births
American football defensive backs
American football running backs
African-American players of American football
Morris Brown Wolverines football players
Kansas City Chiefs players
New York Jets players
Jacksonville Sharks (WFL) players
Players of American football from Savannah, Georgia
American Football League players
21st-century African-American people
20th-century African-American sportspeople